Porn is a common short form for pornography. It may also refer to:

Media
 Alt porn, alternative pornography often produced by small and independent websites or filmmakers
 Bavarian porn, a campy subgenre of comic erotic cinema from Germany
 Food porn, a glamourized spectacular visual presentation of cooking or eating in advertisements, infomercials, cooking shows or other visual media
 Inspiration porn, the calling of people with disabilities inspirational
 Mobile porn, pornography transmitted over mobile telecommunications networks 
 Pessimism porn, alleged eschatological and survivalist thrill some people derive from predicting, reading and fantasizing about the collapse of civil society through the destruction of the world's economic system
 Poverty porn, any type of media, be it written, photographed or filmed, which exploits the poor’s condition in order to generate the necessary sympathy for selling newspapers or increasing charitable donations or support for a given cause
 Revenge porn, sexually explicit media that is publicly shared online without the consent of the pictured individual

Other uses
 Progressive outer retinal necrosis (PORN), a disease of the retina of the eye
 Men of Porn, a San Francisco band consisting of founder Tim Moss, Dale Crover and Billy Anderson
 "Porn", a song by Hammerhead released by Amphetamine Reptile Records
 Þorn (thorn, dorn), a letter used in Germanic languages

See also 

 Pr0n in leetspeek
 Pornography (disambiguation)
 Pawn (disambiguation)
 Pron (disambiguation)